To the Ladies' Paradise (German: Zum Paradies der Damen) is a 1922 German silent film directed by Lupu Pick. It is based on the 1883 novel Au Bonheur des Dames by Emile Zola.

The film's sets were designed by the art director Robert A. Dietrich.

Cast
 Edith Posca
 Lupu Pick
 Harry Nestor
 Walter Brügmann
 Mathilde Sussin
 Hermann Picha
 Olga Limburg
 Leopold von Ledebur

References

Bibliography
 Taylor, Richard. The BFI companion to Eastern European and Russian cinema. BFI Publishing, 2000.

External links

1922 films
Films of the Weimar Republic
Films directed by Lupu Pick
German silent feature films
German black-and-white films
Films based on works by Émile Zola
Films set in department stores
UFA GmbH films